Paracheloïtae or Paracheloitas (ancient Greek: Παραχελωίτας) may refer to:
Paracheloïtae (Aetolia)
Paracheloïtae (Thessaly)